Wolnei Caio (born August 10, 1968) is a former Brazilian football player.

Club statistics

References

External links

odn.ne.jp

1968 births
Living people
Brazilian footballers
J1 League players
Kashiwa Reysol players
Brazilian expatriate footballers
Expatriate footballers in Japan
Association football midfielders